List of major annual events in London, England, by month.

References

 
London
London
Events